David Marrero and Fernando Verdasco were the defending champions, but Verdasco chose not to defend the title and Marrero chose to compete in Marseille instead.

Máximo González and Nicolás Jarry won the title, defeating Thomaz Bellucci and Rogério Dutra Silva in the final, 6–7(3–7), 6–3, [10–7].

Seeds

Draw

Draw

Qualifying

Seeds
  Nicholas Monroe /  Miguel Ángel Reyes-Varela (first round, lucky losers)
  Cameron Norrie /  João Sousa (qualified)

Qualifiers
  Cameron Norrie /  João Sousa

Lucky losers
  Mateus Alves /  Thiago Seyboth Wild
  Nicholas Monroe /  Miguel Ángel Reyes-Varela

Qualifying draw

References

External Links
 Main draw
 Qualifying draw

Rio Open - Doubles
2019 in Brazilian tennis
Rio Open